Cheekies (formerly Chicos) is a chocolate-flavoured jelly lolly (i.e. sweets in British English or candy in American English).

Description
They are similar to Jelly Babies, but rather than being fruit flavoured and in a variety of colours, they are all dark brown and are flavoured with cocoa. They were previously called Chicos in Australia.

Production
Cheekies are Australian made and contain no artificial colours. They are made by the Nestlé Corporation and marketed under their Australian brand Allen's Lollies.

The product previously contained gelatin but the ingredient was removed in 2015 to make Cheekies suitable for vegetarians. Cheekies are noted as a lolly that the public has a polarised opinion on.

Name change
In June 2020, along with Red Skins, Nestlé announced that the name will be changed to represent the inclusive nature of modern society. The company said the decision was made to ensure "nothing we do marginalises our friends, neighbours and colleagues". The statement added "These names have overtones which are out of step with Nestle's values, which are rooted in respect." The word "chico" in Spanish translates as "boy". It can also be considered a derogatory term for people of Latin American descent, although this is not in common usage in Australia. The announcement of a name change occurred in the wake of widespread name changes following the George Floyd protests. On 16 November 2020, Nestlé announced that the new name for Chicos would be Cheekies. Packaging bearing the new name would be available in stores in early 2021.

References

Nestlé brands
Australian confectionery
Gummi candies
Name changes due to the George Floyd protests
Hispanic and Latino American-related controversies